Störst av allt is an album by the Swedish singer Carola Häggkvist. On the album charts, the album peaked at number one in Sweden and number 16 in Norway.

Track listing
"Störst av allt" (Erik Hillestad/Carola Häggkvist)
"Kärleksvals" (Ulrik Neumann/Håkan Elmquist)
"Tillägnan" (Lars Forssell/Monica Dominique)
"Barn och stjärnor" (Ylva Eggehorn/Hans Nyberg)
"Håll mitt hjärta" ("Same Old Story") (Björn Skifs/Lars-Göran Andersson/Peter Hallström)
"Allting har sin tid" (Börge Ring)
"Gammal fäbodpsalm" (Gunlis Österberg/Oskar Lindberg)
"Över älven" (Erik Hillestad/Carola Häggkvist)
"Måne och sol" (Britt G Hallqvist/Egil Hovland)
"Jag har hört om en stad ovan molnen" (Lydia Lithell/Russian)
"Allt kommer bli bra mamma" (Carola Häggkvist)
"Jag ger dig min morgon" ("I Give You the Morning") (Tom Paxton/Fred Åkerström)
"Den första gång jag såg dig" (Birger Sjöberg)
"Närmare Gud till dig" ("Nearer, My God, to Thee") (Sarah Fuller Adams/Emanuel Linderholm/Lowel Mason)
"Genom allt" (album version) (Carola Häggkvist)
"Genom allt" (radio version) (Carola Häggkvist)

Singles

Genom allt
Genom allt (radio version)

Release history

Charts

References

2005 albums
Carola Häggkvist albums
Swedish-language albums